Yongning County (Xiao'erjing: يٌ‌نِئٍ ثِيًا) is a county of Ningxia Hui Autonomous Region, China, it is under the administration of the prefecture-level city of Yinchuan, the capital of Ningxia, bordering Inner Mongolia to the west.

Characteristics

Yongning County is an agricultural county, with abundant resources and high quality products. In recent years, the county's major crops have been melons and vegetables. Food processing factories have been established as well. The county government is located on Yanghe Street, and the county's postal code is 750100.

Administrative divisions
Yongning County has 5 towns 1 township and 2 other.
5 towns
 Yanghe
 Minning
 Wanghong
 Wangyuan
 Lijun

1 township
 Shengli

2 other
 Yuquanying Farm
 Huangyangtan Farm

Climate

Transportation 
China National Highway 211

References

County-level divisions of Ningxia
Yinchuan